Holyfield may refer to:

 Holyfield, Essex, a hamlet in Waltham Abbey parish, England
Holyfield (surname), a surname (including a list of people with the name)

See also
Hollyfield (disambiguation)